The Kalthoffs were a prominent Danish family of gunsmiths during the 17th century, best known for the Kalthoff repeater — a rapid fire flintlock repeating rifle that could reach a rate of fire of 20–30 rounds/minute.  Signed specimens of their guns can be found kept in the Windsor Castle, the Danish War Museum, the Swedish Royal Armoury and the Kremlin Armoury collections.

The family was founded by Herman Kolthoff from Kultenhof Estate in the Danish Duchy of Schleswig (now Kaltenhof, Schleswig-Holstein, Germany), who had several sons that went on to fame across Europe.
 Peder Hermansen Kalthoff — Served Frederik III of Denmark as Head of Armory, 1600–1672
 Matthias Hermansen Kalthoff — Gunsmith Denmark, 1608–1681
 Caspar Hermansen Kalthoff Elder — Served Charles I of England, 1606–1664
 Caspar Kalthoff Younger — Served Tsar Alexis of Russia and Charles II of England
 Henrick Hermansen Kolthoff — Founded Foundries in Sweden and Norway, 1610–1661
 William Hermansen Kalthoff — Patented repeating gun in France

Descendants 
The Kalthoff name is a single family name, and spelling name was recorded as Kaldtoft, Kalthof, Kaltof, Kaltoft, Koldtoft according to local pronunciation and spelling habits. All of the families with these names in Scandinavia are descendants. The original seed Kalthoff in each country shared the "Hermansen" name indicating a common father, was famous for advanced metallurgic skills (iron manufacturing, advanced steel formula for repeating rifles, etc.), and were born within a decade of each other.

References 
 Harold L. Peterson The Book of the Gun Paul Hamlyn Publishing Group (1962)
 Robert M. Lee & R. L. Wilson, Art of the Gun Yellowstone Press (2002)
 Guy M Wilson The Vauxhall Operatory. A century of inventions before the Scientific Revolution, Basiliscoe Press (2010)
 S.E. Ellacott, Guns, Methuen (1960)
 Gordon Campbell, The Grove Encyclopedia of Decorative Arts, Oxford University Press, (2006)
 Arne Hoff,Ældre dansk bøssemageri, Tøjhusmuseet, 1951

External links
Bibliography of the Kalthoff family in Sweden
Herman Kolthoff Family Tree
 Raadvad Mill
 Gut Kaltenhof

Gunsmiths